Rafael Guimarães Lopes  (born 28 July 1991) is a Portuguese professional footballer who plays as a forward for Cypriot First Division club AEK Larnaca.

Club career

Portugal
Born in Esposende, Braga District, Lopes started his senior career with Varzim S.C. in the Segunda Liga. In the summer of 2011 he moved to the Primeira Liga after joining Vitória FC, making his debut in the competition on 9 September when he came on as a late substitute in a 3–0 away loss against FC Porto. He scored his first goal for his new club on 18 December, helping to a 1–1 draw at C.D. Nacional.

In the 2013 off-season, after failing to find the net for Moreirense F.C. in 21 bench appearances and suffering top-level relegation, Lopes returned to division two with F.C. Penafiel. He moved back to the top tier the following winter transfer window, signing for Académica de Coimbra until June 2016.

On 20 June 2016, after another relegation, Lopes joined fellow league side G.D. Chaves on a one-year contract. Two of his league goals during the campaign came in consecutive 2–2 draws in early January 2017, against Rio Ave F.C. and Sporting CP.

Omonia
On 10 July 2017, Lopes agreed to a two-year deal with AC Omonia from the Cypriot First Division. He made his debut on 10 September in the season opener, a 2–1 home win against Ethnikos Achna FC.

Return to Portugal and Poland
Lopes returned to his homeland in July 2018, on a one-year contract at Boavista FC. He scored just three times during his spell at the Estádio do Bessa, once in the fourth round of the Taça de Portugal to help dispose of hosts S.C. Espinho 4–0.

On 29 May 2019, Lopes moved to the Ekstraklasa by signing a two-year deal with KS Cracovia. He netted a career-best 12 goals in his only season, also helping the club to win its first-ever Polish Cup after beating Lechia Gdańsk 3–2 in extra time.

Lopes joined Legia Warsaw for 2020–21. He contributed four goals during that campaign for the champions.

Later career
On 10 July 2021, Lopes signed for two seasons with AEK Larnaca FC from Cyprus.

International career
Lopes was part of the Portugal squad at the 2011 FIFA U-20 World Cup. He played four matches in the tournament held in Colombia, in an eventual runner-up finish.

Honours
Cracovia
Polish Cup: 2019–20

Legia Warsaw
Ekstraklasa: 2020–21

Portugal U20
FIFA U-20 World Cup runner-up: 2011

Orders
 Knight of the Order of Prince Henry

References

External links

1991 births
Living people
People from Esposende
Sportspeople from Braga District
Portuguese footballers
Association football forwards
Primeira Liga players
Liga Portugal 2 players
A.D. Esposende players
Varzim S.C. players
Vitória F.C. players
Moreirense F.C. players
F.C. Penafiel players
Associação Académica de Coimbra – O.A.F. players
G.D. Chaves players
Boavista F.C. players
Cypriot First Division players
AC Omonia players
AEK Larnaca FC players
Ekstraklasa players
MKS Cracovia (football) players
Legia Warsaw players
Portugal youth international footballers
Portuguese expatriate footballers
Expatriate footballers in Cyprus
Expatriate footballers in Poland
Portuguese expatriate sportspeople in Cyprus
Portuguese expatriate sportspeople in Poland